Bear Brook is a tributary of Pascack Brook in New Jersey.  It joins with the Pascack at the Woodcliff Lake Reservoir and forms part of the border between Park Ridge and Woodcliff Lake. The brook flows through portions of Bergen County in New Jersey and its headwaters lay in Rockland County, New York.  In Park Ridge, a park named Atkins Glen surrounds a portion of the brook and is home to several shallow caverns, in some of which Native American artifacts have been found.

See also
 List of rivers of New Jersey

Rivers of Bergen County, New Jersey
Rivers of Rockland County, New York
Hackensack River
Pascack Valley
Rivers of New Jersey
Rivers of New York (state)